Norwich Research Park is a business community located to the southwest of Norwich, Norfolk, in East Anglia, England close to the A11 and the A47 roads.

Set in over 230 hectares of parkland, Norwich Research Park is home to over 12,000 people, including 3,000 researchers and clinicians with an annual research spend of over £130 million.

Norwich Research Park is a partnership between the University of East Anglia, the Norfolk and Norwich University Hospital, four independent world-renowned research institutes, namely the John Innes Centre, the Quadram Institute and the Earlham Institute, (all strategically funded by the Biotechnology and Biological Sciences Research Council BBSRC) and The Sainsbury Laboratory linked to the Gatsby Charitable Foundation.

The focus of the Norwich Research Park is on creating and supporting new companies and jobs based on bioscience, in 2011 the Government awarded BBSRC £26 million to invest in Norwich Research Park.

Norwich Research Park is a member of the UK Association of Science Parks UKSPA

History
The foundations for Norwich Research Park were laid in the 1960s when major institutions began to converge in the area.  Beginning with John Innes Centre in 1967, the then named John Innes Institute relocated to Norwich to work closely with the School of Biological Sciences at the recently established University of East Anglia.

The research park was officially launched in 1992 when it comprised the schools of Biological and Chemical Sciences at the UEA, the John Innes Centre, IFR Norwich, the MAFF's Food Science Laboratory and the British Sugar Technical Centre (formerly British Sugar Research Laboratory). The MAFF laboratory moved to York in 1992. The British Sugar presence at the site since 1968 ended when closed its laboratories in Norwich in 2001.

Today, Norwich Research Park is one of Europe's leading centres for research in Food, Health and the Environment.

Developments to the Park include:

 The new Centrum building, which was officially opened in July 2014.
 The Bob Champion Research and Education Building was officially opened in February 2015. A £19 million medical research centre, it is named after the former Grand National winning jockey Bob Champion MBE.
 The Enterprise Centre at UEA opened in July 2015.
 The Quadram Institute which opened in 2018. The Institute is a partnership between Quadram Institute Bioscience, the Norfolk and Norwich University Hospitals NHS Foundation Trust, the University of East Anglia and the Biotechnology and Biological Sciences Research Council (BBSRC).

Leadership
The Executive Chair of the Anglia Innovation Partnership LLP (AIP LLP), responsible for bringing the Norwich Research Park vision to life, is David Parfrey.  Appointed in March 2018, David is overseeing a period in which the partner organisations of the AIP LLP are seeking to review the LLP’s achievements over the last 5 years and its strategy for the next 5 years, particularly in respect of the opportunities presented by the Government’s Industrial Strategy. 

In 2012 key stakeholders in Norwich Research Park created the Norwich Research Partners Limited Liability Partnership which was renamed Anglia Innovation Partnership LLP in July 2018, to help the Park achieve its vision.  Its non-executive board is chaired by David Parfrey, currently Executive Director, Finance & Campus Operations, at the Biotechnology and Biological Sciences Research Council (BBSRC) who took over the role from former chair Professor David Richardson, Vice-Chancellor – University of East Anglia (UEA) prior to this the chair was held by Anthony Habgood who completed his tenure in March 2016.  Other board representatives are Mark Davies, CEO Norfolk and Norwich University Hospitals NHS Foundation Trust; David Harvey, Harvey & Co Ltd representing John Innes Foundation; Ian Charles, Director Quadram Institute; Dale Sanders, Director John Innes Centre; Neil Hall, Director Earlham Institute; Nick Talbot, Executive Director The Sainsbury Laboratory ; Steve Visscher, Deputy CEx & COO for the BBSRC.

References

Norwich
Science and technology in Norfolk
Science parks in the United Kingdom